Garmabalah-ye Sofla (also Romanized as Garmābalah-ye Soflá and Garmāvaleh-ye Soflá) is a village in Zagheh Rural District, Zagheh District, Khorramabad County, Lorestan Province, Iran. At the 2006 census, its population was 113, in 24 families.

References 

Towns and villages in Khorramabad County